The Runga are an ethnic group in Chad as well as the Central African Republic, in which they are found in the north and northeast of the country. The majority of the Runga are Muslim.

Organization
The Runga are distinguished between the Runga who speak Arabic
and the Runga-Aiki who speak Aiki (and often also Arabic). Despite this linguistic distinction, there is a great cultural homogeneity.

Notes

Ethnic groups in the Central African Republic
Ethnic groups in Chad